Jackson Township is one of twenty townships in Benton County, Iowa, USA.  As of the 2000 census, its population was 710.

History
Jackson Township was founded in 1848.

Geography
According to the United States Census Bureau, Jackson Township covers an area of 36.04 square miles (93.35 square kilometers); of this, 36 square miles (93.24 square kilometers, 99.88 percent) is land and 0.04 square miles (0.11 square kilometers, 0.12 percent) is water.

Cities, towns, villages
 Garrison

Extinct towns
 Benton Station at 
(These towns are listed as "historical" by the USGS.)

Adjacent townships
 Cedar Township (north)
 Taylor Township (east)
 Eden Township (southeast)
 Big Grove Township (south)
 Homer Township (southwest)
 Monroe Township (west)
 Bruce Township (northwest)

Cemeteries
The township contains these three cemeteries: Carlisle Grove, Garrison and Pratt Creek.

Major highways
  U.S. Route 218

School districts
 Vinton-Shellsburg Community School District

Political districts
 Iowa's 3rd congressional district
 State House District 39
 State Senate District 20

References
 United States Census Bureau 2007 TIGER/Line Shapefiles
 United States Board on Geographic Names (GNIS)
 United States National Atlas

External links

 
US-Counties.com
City-Data.com

Townships in Benton County, Iowa
Cedar Rapids, Iowa metropolitan area
Townships in Iowa
1848 establishments in Iowa
Populated places established in 1848